Mount Hope Cemetery may refer to:

In Canada:
 Mount Hope Catholic Cemetery, Toronto, Ontario
 Mount Hope Cemetery (Kitchener), Kitchener, Ontario

In the United States:
 Mount Hope Cemetery (San Diego), California
 Mount Hope Cemetery (Independence, Kansas), featured in My Ghost Story
 Mount Hope Cemetery, Hiawatha Township, Brown County, Kansas
 Mount Hope Cemetery (Bangor, Maine)
 Mount Hope Cemetery (Boston), Boston, Massachusetts
 Mount Hope Cemetery (Brooklyn), a Jewish cemetery in New York City
 Mount Hope Cemetery (Chicago), Illinois, burial site of Gustavus Franklin Swift
 Mount Hope Cemetery (Lemay, Missouri), listed on the National Register of Historic Places in St. Louis County, Missouri
 Mount Hope Cemetery (Lansing, Michigan)
 Mount Hope Cemetery (Hill County, Montana), a cemetery in Hill County, Montana
 Mount Hope Cemetery (Rochester), New York
 Mount Hope Cemetery (Raleigh, North Carolina), listed on the National Register of Historic Places in Wake County, North Carolina
 Mount Hope Cemetery (Watertown, South Dakota)
 Mount Hope Cemetery (Franklin, Tennessee), burial site of Minnie Pearl, Felton Jarvis